SM U-101 was one of the 329 submarines serving in the Imperial German Navy in World War I. 
U-101 was engaged in the German campaign against Allied commerce (Handelskrieg) during that conflict.

Summary of raiding history

References

Notes

Citations

Bibliography

World War I submarines of Germany
Type U 57 submarines
Ships built in Bremen (state)
1917 ships
U-boats commissioned in 1917